SUNY Orange (Orange County Community College) is a public community college with two campuses, one in Middletown, New York and one in Newburgh, New York. It is part of the State University of New York (SUNY) system and offers almost 40 associate degrees and certificate programs. SUNY Orange is accredited by Middle States Commission on Higher Education. The college employs an open enrollment policy to all applicants who are graduates of an accredited high school or recipients of a state high school equivalency diploma.

History
In 1945, Orange County did not have a public college. Except for the military academy at West Point and what would become SUNY New Paltz, there was no college on the west side of the Hudson River from New York City to the state capital at Albany. The research for a permanent college began after World War II in 1948, and a site needed to be chosen for the college.

The Webb Horton House and property, now the 'mansion' at the Middletown campus, was chosen for founding the college. Built by Webb Horton, the mansion was left to his cousin, John H. Morrison, upon his death. His wife Mrs. Christine Morrison, lived there alone after the death of her husband in 1946. In 1950, she donated the mansion and property as the home of Orange County Community College.

The College was founded in 1950, opening its doors to 160 students as the first county-sponsored community college in the SUNY system. It was the first community college in the nation to offer a two-year nursing degree program.

When it opened, the College consisted of Morrison Hall and Horton Hall, on 14 acres. Today, it has 12 buildings at the Middletown campus, and two buildings at the Newburgh campus.

Campuses
SUNY Orange comprises two campuses: the main one in city of Middletown, New York and the Newburgh branch campus, situated on the banks of the Hudson River.

Academics
SUNY Orange offers a total of 39 associate degrees and certificate programs.  The college currently enrolls approximately 7,000 students annually. The college has matriculation agreements with more than 30 four-year institutions, facilitating the transfer of SUNY Orange students graduating with an associate degree who want to complete 4-year degrees.

Student life
The college's center for student involvement arranges entertainment, sporting events and trips each semester at both campuses.  The college also has an Alumni Relations office which holds events specifically for alumni throughout the year.  The college also has a chapter of Phi Theta Kappa, the international honors society for two-year colleges.

The Middletown campus offers a dental clinic, fitness studios, a swimming pool, soccer and softball fields, computer and tutorial labs, child-care facilities, theatre, gymnasium, art gallery, gaming rooms and micro-markets on-campus. The Newburgh campus has its own child-care facilities, fitness room, micro-market, art gallery, and gaming room.

Community programs and events
SUNY Orange offers a wide variety of programs and events to the local community. The colleges Continuing and Professional Education department offers G.E.D. programs, industry certifications and personal enrichments programs.  The ENCORE program offers classes for people over 50.  The college allows free auditing of classes for community members 60 or above.  The college's Cultural Affairs department has a variety of exhibits, lectures, master classes, theater performances and concerts each semester which are open to the public.

See also
Webb Horton House

References

External links
Official website

Two-year colleges in the United States
Education in Orange County, New York
Middletown, Orange County, New York
SUNY community colleges
Educational institutions established in 1950
1950 establishments in New York (state)
NJCAA athletics